Castaways is an American reality television show produced by ABC. The series premiered on August 7, 2018, and chronicles the lives of 12 individuals as they try to survive on a number of islands in Indonesia.

Overview 
Unlike other reality shows, participants on Castaways may not be initially aware that there are other "Castaways" nearby. This had led some sources to compare the show to Lost. Moreover, the participants can leave only by waiting for a rescue team at the end of the show or by quitting.

Each castaway has one piece of luggage.  They all arrive alone and with their or someone else's luggage washed up on shore with them.  Everyone is required to have a journal in their luggage where they write about themselves, thus allowing those who find it to learn about them.

Leading 

The Castaways TV series is an American Competition Reality Television Show which was released on 7 August 2018. It is produced by Grant Kahler from Nomad Entertainment. The location for this series is in the South Pacific, Indonesian Batanta. It contains ten episodes that were weekly played on the platforms of IMDb, YouTube, and TV Guide from 7 August to 18 September.

The series follows 12 people in the age range of 20 to 62 who were individually dropped off on the Indonesian island. They were aimed to seek life chances and rescues for staying on the island. The participants challenged themselves to survive from wash-up luggage, scattered resources, and abandoned shelters on the island. Each of them was alone and they might unaware that there were other participants nearby. Furthermore, they only can leave by waiting for rescue or choosing to quit.

Through the episodes, the Castaways feature the flashback segments to the pre-island lives of participants. This revolutionary reality show by ABC aims to test the “human need for companionship under the extreme circumstances.”  A combination of the elements is shown in Castaways show which incorporates the aspects from “Survivors” and “Lost and Alone.” 

The public voice toward Castaways is varied which leads to a number of social phenomena and discussions. Compared to Castaways, there are other popular survival reality TV shows and documentaries that entertain the public, such as “Man vs Wild”, “Survivor Man”, “Out of the Wild: Venezuela”, “Dual Survival”, and “Naked and Afraid.” The Survival and adventure Reality Series is one of the most popular genres in the Reality show industry. The social effects and constant criticism were brought to the stage. The authenticity of the survival shows is also one of the hot topics. In some cases, the production team has the involvement of providing scripts that makes contestants speak certain things or make certain decisions.

According to ABC reports, the ratings of the show are typically the best indication of whether the show can stay on the air. The highest rating of Castaways Season 1 is episode 1 which contains 3.127 million viewers. The rate of viewers decreases adequately from episode 1 to episode 7. From episode 8, the rating has increased by 73.43%. The rating is a downward trend to the end of episode 10. Compared to other ABC TV shows during the same period, the rating of Castaways was quite low. Thus, ABC cancelled Castaways for season 2.

The Rise of Adventure Reality Television Shows 

Under the different social and cultural contexts, one of the compelling factors of the Reality Television Programs is that it focuses on the everyday lives of the subjects in some natural settings, as well as inviting nonfactors and real people to contribute to the diverse perspectives of television culture. The Reality Television genre began with the hidden camera style in the 1940s, and the first American Reality TV show “Candid Camera” was started on the radio and became popular because of its unscripted events and real-life people’s participation. Then and now, the Reality television industry is moving into divergent subgenres, including the dating programs, the competition shows, and lifestyle programs. According to Kosenko et al (2018), the typical reality shows were born out of the broadcast industry’s financial crisis such as America’s Most wanted, and Rescue 911. As one of the highest-rated television shows of the time, a new exploration of adventure race reality shows begins. At the same time, the Swedish Reality TV series Expedition Robinson series gained a loyal audience and generated the press interest for its novel combination of real people and artificial dramatic settings. This type of subgenre incorporates different formats that are a “generic hybrid”. The Reality Gameshow “Survivor” is an example of revealing the combination of aesthetic and textual characteristics through the show, where the setting of dessert Island reflects the US ideology and concept of imperialism  Besides, The New York Times said the “survivor breaks the mould of comedies, dramas, and news programmes.”  and Richard M. Huff claims that the “Survivor” launched the real revolution in the United States Thus, the emergence of the adventure television industry relates to the multiple aspects of society and community. The simulation of social life in the survival reality show produces diverse understandings and knowledge which can bring into people’s real life. It provides opportunities for the individuals to discover the show’s potential life knowledge, such as life-saving strategies.

Production of Castaways Television Series 

Producer: Castaways is produced by Nomad Entertainment which is associated with the executive producer and showrunner Grant Kahler. He created a series of television documentaries and reality shows, e.g., Madhouse, Alaska: The Last Frontier, History’s Alone, and the selection: Special Operations Experiment. Grant Kahler has been with Alone for all five seasons, and Castaways is a new series that which he tries to promote the values of “natural” and “unscripted”, testing the human need for companionship and how humans react to the unknown.

Locations: All ten episodes are recorded in South Pacific, Indonesia Islands, and Batanta. The New York Times reports that there are 12 uninhabited small islands, and the locations are quite challenged and exciting for the 12 stranded participants.

Cinematography:  The Castaways production team utilises expert cinematography by using VariCam LT 4K cinema camcorders. The director of photography Neil Moore monitors and allocates the camera operators who take responsibility to shoot the 12 documentaries in parallel. There are up to 12 photographers and operators who are assigned to Castaway’s location work. According to what Moore said about the shooting, “We gathered an incredible amount of footage, with 12 cameras simultaneously shooting eight hours a day.”  The cinematography of Castaways gives off an all-around sense of production  and the photography team was working with predominantly natural light. The Editing of the series also provides flashback segments. Each participant faces obstacles and there are some intercuts moments that quick flashback their lives before arriving at Castaways.

Review and Social Impact 
The perspectives towards Castaways are varied, which leads to the wider thinking of the society.

It’s been said that survival reality TV shows have the instructional capacity that allows the audience to learn survival strategies. The media brings the opportunity for the audience to potentially learn safety strategies under extreme environmental circumstances. For example, the Rescue 911 in 1988 was featured in the re-enactments of disasters averted by calls to 911. This show brought a large impact on media, society, and the viewers. According to Kosenko et al (2018) and Hinton (1999), there were numerous letters and calls from the viewers who described their lives changed after watching the Rescue 911 episodes. Thus, survival television shows can influence individuals’ lives. Based on the Social Learning Theory, focuses on how human actions are dictated by reciprocal influences of personal experience and environmental factors. The research conducted that the individuals who have watched survival reality shows gain better life-threatening strategies. Moreover, the research from Watts (2009) also gives an insight into the instructional capacity of reality shows and their impacts on human lives. Not only the Castaways from ABC, Naked and Afraid from Discovery Channel, and Get Out Alive from NBC are also exploring different kinds of challenges that people possibly can encounter within the extraordinary circumstances.

Although the format of reality tv shows attracts a wide range of audiences, society demonstrates divergent perceptions of the aspects of authenticity. Beck et al. (2012) argue that “their reality is manipulated for dramaturgical reasons by edited and reconstructed scenes, by careful selection of cast and settings, and sometimes by scripted elements.” They provide studies on how the audience perceives the narratives of the reality tv series and how this impacts an individual’s perspective. According to the Castaways TV series review site, the audience Miles Surrey claimed how to do audience believes the show is real, and whether the participants just spent hours in their makeup to film this show. He feels that the watching experience is confusing and suspicious. On the other side, an associated press poll from 2005 has indicated that the viewers did not care much about the “reality” itself, they just enjoy watching “the ironic mixture of the factitious and the spontaneous” in the reality tv shows  The other viewer Andy Dehnart also shared opinions that he thought the cinemaphotography of Castaways series is splendid and it highlights the hope and connection between humans and nature. Moreover, the study by Alice Hall (2009) investigated the viewer perceptions of typically reality programs. She found that the vast number of viewers were more likely to accept the factuality of the reality shows and they tended to like watching unscripted events. Compare those opinions, the perceptions towards the concept of authenticity are varied. Not only the authenticity is desired by society, but the participants’ values that had been reflected in the reality programs are also impacting society’s criticism, judgement, and concerns.

To summarise, the prevalence and the social effects of reality TV programs become a widely discussed topic. One of the most important areas of reality shows is to entertain the audience which is different from documentaries. The Castaways series review sites showcase the opposite voices towards the notions of authenticity and the perceptions of watching Reality shows. Klaus and Lücke (2003) distinguish the boundary as “narrative” and “performance”, whereas Nabi (2007) divides it as “romance” and “competition.”  These boundaries demonstrate the diversification of the Reality Televisions Genres. 
Moreover, the research has proved that the survival Reality series have the instructional capacity in teaching viewers life-saving techniques which positively raise the social awareness of how to live and save oneself under the threats. On the other hand, those reality programs are conducted as a marketing vehicle to invade participants’ personal experiences and privacy. The reality shows allow the public to take part in the events in the show and create a sense of involvement, and in this way, the diverse perspectives and understandings of the shows may bring concerns to the audience about their reality and authenticity. The participants and producers might also experience criticism from the viewers on the social platforms.

Participants 
There are 12 castaways:

Episodes

References 

2010s American reality television series
2018 American television series debuts
English-language television shows
Adventure reality television series
American Broadcasting Company original programming
2018 American television series endings
Television shows filmed in Indonesia